Korvin, an alternative of Corvin from the Latin name Corvinus is a surname and may refer to:

Charles Korvin (1907–1998), American actor
Eddie Korvin, American recording engineer, composer and music producer
Mickael Korvin (born 1957), Franco-American author and translator, creator of "nouvofrancet", a simplified method of learning French
Ottó Korvin (1894–1919), Hungarian communist politician

See also
Anna Korvin-Krukovskaya (1843-1887), birth name of Anne Jaclard, Russian socialist and feminist revolutionary
Vladimir L'vovich Korvin-Piotrovskii (1891-1966), Russian emigre poet
Zoia Korvin-Krukovsky (1903-1999), Russian-Swedish artist